, a 118-gun ship of the line of the French Navy
 , an 1890~1910 ship, renamed , 1910~1929,
 , an oil tanker of the Second World War
 , a French merchant ship built 1900 and wrecked off Kangaroo Island in South Australia in 1906.

Montebello